The 11th Infantry Division was a division of the Philippine Army under the United States Army Forces in the Far East (USAFFE).

Organization

History
It operated from 1941 to April 9, 1942, when Bataan fell, and then it gave up.  It was organized and trained in Zambales Province of Northern Luzon.  Col. (later BGen.) William E. Brougher (USA) was the division's commander.

Combat Narrative
At the opening of hostilities, 8 December 1941, the 11th Division formed a part of BGen. (later LGen.) Jonathan M. Wainwright's North Luzon Force of the Philippine Army (later renamed I Philippine Corps), alongside the 21st and 31st Divisions, and the 26th Cavalry Regiment.

Order of Battle
 11th Infantry Regiment (PA) (Col. Glen R. Townsend, Inf.)
 12th Infantry Regiment (PA) 
 13th Infantry Regiment (PA) 
 11th Field Artillery Regiment (PA) (Col. James C. Hughes, FA) 
 11th FA Regt HQ Company (PA) 
 1st Bn/11th FA Regt (PA) (75mm guns, 16x) 
 2nd Bn/11th FA Regt (PA) (2.95-inch pack howitzers, 8x)
 3rd Bn/11th FA Regt (PA) 
 11th Engineer Battalion (PA)
 11th Division Units (PA) 
 11th Division Headquarters & HQ Company (PA) 
 11th Medical Battalion (PA) 
 11th Signal Company (PA) 
 11th Quartermaster Company (Motorized) (PA) 
 11th QM Transport Company (Truck)  (PA)

Sources

Bibliography
Morton, Louis. The Fall of the Philippines (Publication 5-2) . Retrieved on 14 Feb 2017.

References

Infantry divisions of the Philippines
Military units and formations of the Philippine Army in World War II
Military units and formations established in 1941
Military units and formations disestablished in 1942